Keevil Daly (21 December 1923 – 28 June 2011) was a male weightlifter, who competed in the light heavyweight and middle heavyweight class and who represented British Guiana, and later Canada, at international competitions. He won the silver medal at the 1947 World Weightlifting Championships in the 82.5 kg category.

As a merchant marine, he survived being torpedoed during World War II on the Canadian ship SS Lady Nelson. After the war, Daly became the first black graduate of Ryerson Polytechnical as a Royal Canadian Air Force serviceman.

References

1923 births
2011 deaths
Guyanese male weightlifters
Canadian male weightlifters
World Weightlifting Championships medalists
Sportspeople from Georgetown, Guyana
Weightlifters at the 1954 British Empire and Commonwealth Games
Weightlifters at the 1958 British Empire and Commonwealth Games
Commonwealth Games medallists in weightlifting
Commonwealth Games gold medallists for Canada
British Guiana people
Guyanese emigrants to Canada
Black Canadian sportspeople
Afro-Guyanese people
Canadian sailors
Guyanese people of World War II
Toronto Metropolitan University alumni
Royal Canadian Air Force personnel
Medallists at the 1954 British Empire and Commonwealth Games